Tent Mountain is located on the border of Alberta and British Columbia on the Continental Divide. It was named in 1911 by Morrison P. Bridgland.

See also
 List of peaks on the Alberta–British Columbia border
 Mountains of Alberta
 Mountains of British Columbia

References

Tent Mountain
Tent Mountain
Canadian Rockies